Cold Spring Lane station is a light rail station on the Baltimore Light Rail system. The stop is located on Cold Spring Lane near the interchange with Interstate 83. The station has two side platforms serving two tracks.

The Cold Spring Lane stop is in close proximity to  the former Melvale station of the Northern Central Railway, an affiliate of the Pennsylvania Railroad.

Transit-oriented development
Following a 2012 proposal for a mixed-use transit-oriented development at 2001 West Cold Spring Lane near the Cold Spring Lane light rail station, the Baltimore Development Corporation (BDC) acquired a 16-acre parcel in the area in 2016. Following the land acquisition by BDC, developers Klein Enterprises and Manekin LLC announced the development of an apartment complex at the site, and in spring 2020 the construction of the 284-unit building named The Woodberry was completed. Adjacent to the Jones Falls stream north of the Woodberry neighborhood, the development aims to bring residents to an area with potentially advantageous transit links due to its proximity to the light rail line and the Jones Falls trail. However, the project has been met with criticism throughout the planning process and following its construction, with transit advocates highlighting poor connectivity to the Cold Spring Lane station, and the fact that it shares a name with the Woodberry station to the south rather than the station it is adjacent to.

References

External links
Cold Spring Lane entrance from Google Maps Street View

Baltimore Light Rail stations
Railway stations in the United States opened in 1992
1992 establishments in Maryland
Railway stations in Baltimore
Woodberry, Baltimore